Alamnagar Union is a union of Gopalpur Upazila, Tangail District, Bangladesh. It is situated at 42 km north of Tangail.

Demographics

According to Population Census 2011 performed by Bangladesh Bureau of Statistics, The total population of Alamnagar union is 19752. There are  households 5281 in total.

Education

The literacy rate of Alamnagar Union is 41.2% (Male-43.4%, Female-39.1%).

See also
 Union Councils of Tangail District

References

Populated places in Dhaka Division
Populated places in Tangail District
Unions of Gopalpur Upazila